Buffer is a software application for the web and mobile, designed to manage accounts in social networks, by providing the means for a user to schedule posts to Twitter, Facebook, Instagram, Instagram Stories, Pinterest, and LinkedIn, as well as analyze their results and engage with their community. It is owned by remote company Buffer Inc.

The application was designed by a group of European experts in San Francisco, most notably Joel Gascoigne and Leo Widrich. Gascoigne is currently the CEO of Buffer.  By August 2021, the team had reached 85 people working remotely from 15 countries in different parts of the world, more than 4.5 million registered users and over $16 million in annual revenue.

History

Buffer began its development in October 2010 in Birmingham, United Kingdom by co-founder Joel Gascoigne, who established the idea of the social media application while he was in the United Kingdom. Once he developed the idea he created a landing page to see if enough people were interested in the product to make it a profitable venture. After reaching a critical mass of registrations, Gascoigne built and designed the first version of the application software over a span of 7 weeks.

On November 30, 2010, the initial version of Buffer was launched. It contained limited features which only allowed access to Twitter. Four days after the software's launch Buffer gained its first paying user. A few weeks after this, the number of users reached 100, and then that number multiplied to 100,000 users within the next 9 months.

In July 2011, the cofounders decided to move the startup venture from the United Kingdom to San Francisco in the United States, and Buffer was converted into an incorporation.  Whilst in San Francisco, the cofounders dealt with the San Franciscan startup incubators AngelPad. This was due to the increase in cost after moving from Birmingham. Throughout December 2011, cofounders Joel and Leo were able to secure 18 investors to their company, after being refused by 88% of the people they met with to offer an investment to their company. The investors include Maneesh Arora, the founder of MightyText, Thomas Korte, the founder of AngelPad, and Andy McLoughlin, the co-founder of the software company Huddle.

Due to visa issues with the co-founders, the company's base shifted to Hong Kong in January 2012. Then in August 2012, following more visa issues, it migrated again to Tel Aviv, Israel. In October 2012, Joel Gascoigne reported that "1.5-2% of users are on the paid plan, so we’re currently on a $800,000 annual run rate". In May 2013, the company's base shifted back to the United States, after the co-founders’ visa predicaments were resolved. Around this time Buffer intentionally made its salary calculation algorithm public (along with the calculated salaries of its 13 employees; this number has since grown to exceed 80, almost all of whom opt-in to the salary-publishing culture).

Features

Free features
Buffer allows users to schedule posts sent through the application to the user's social media accounts (you can connect 3 social accounts via the free version). This feature can schedule and send posts to Twitter, Instagram, Facebook, LinkedIn and Pinterest. There are various default time slots in the application, which are based on the times during the day when social media users are most active online. However, Buffer does allow its users to mend or remove the default time slots if they wish to do so. The free version of the application allows a maximum limit of 10 posts to be scheduled at any given time, and only allows the management of one social media account per social media website. Buffer also contains features that give post suggestions to users, and gives information on the number of clicks, retweets, likes, favorites, mentions and potential views each post has, which is based on the number of feeds that single feed would show up on.

The Buffer application is compatible with three different platforms:
Browser: allows the application to work as downloaded extensions for three browsers: Google Chrome, Safari and Mozilla Firefox.
Mobile: allows the application to be installed on iOS systems and Android phones.
Newsreader: allows the application to be integrated with various newsreader applications, such as Flipboard and Zite.

Paid features
Buffer offers a paid plan, named Pro, which gives paying users access to additional features, such as the Feeds feature that adds an RSS feed to a user's Buffer profile, displaying suggested links from external websites chosen by the user. Additional features include analytics for the number of posts sent out and the number of active users over a span of time. The plan also allows an increased limit of 100 posts at any single time, and the option to manage 8 social account profiles. On August 6, 2019, Buffer announced a new feature for paid plans - the Hashtag Manager. The new feature allows paying members to create and save groups of hashtags directly within the Buffer composer.

Buffer for Business 
Buffer for Business is an extension of the Buffer application intended for managing social media accounts for businesses and corporations. It launched in 2013. It contains a similar interface to Buffer, but with additional features, including:

More specified analytics that allow comparisons between different metrics, such as between retweets clicks and posts, sorting of different data to the preference of the user, and accumulation of statistics
Team collaboration features that contains approval features, admin privileges that give privileges to users assigned as managers over any other member assigned as a contributor, and allows more members of a team to access and manage the accounts
Exporting options that allow data, statistics and analysis to be exported to any reports or documents

The costs of Buffer for Business differ depending on the scale and size of the potential user's business. The categories are:

Small Business: which allows the management of 25 social media accounts and the access of 5 team members
Medium Business: which allows management of 50 social media accounts and the access of 10 team members
Large Business or Agency: which allows management of 50 social media accounts and the access of 10 team members

Buffer for Business produced over 10% of the company's total revenue in December 2013. In 2014, the app was used by over 2,500 publishers and agencies. Organizations that use Buffer for Business include About.com, Fortune, and Business Insider.

Popularity and growth

After its establishment in 2010, Buffer's total revenue per year increased to $1 million in January 2013, and then crossed $2 million in September of the same year through the growth of customers using the application. By September 2013, Buffer gained 1 million users, with around 16,000 paying users. The number of posts shared through Buffer application crossed 87,790,000 posts and the number of accounts that were used through the application reached 1,266,722, with an average of 70 posts per account. By February 2014, the number of Buffer users reached 1.3 million. The organization's annual revenue reached $3,900,000, a 38.3% increase since December 2013.

Acquisitions 
In December 2015, Buffer acquired Respondly, a social media customer service and brand monitoring tool, which it has since rebranded to Reply. According to the terms of the contract, the cost of the acquisition was not released.

Partnerships

Buffer is partnered with various other software applications and companies. Most notably, Buffer is an official Facebook Marketing Partner under Community Management. Additionally, Buffer has partnerships with WordPress, Twitter, Zapier, IFTTT, Feedly, Pocket, Shopify, Reeder, and Quuu.

Security

In October 2013, Buffer's system was hacked, allowing the hackers to get access to many users’ accounts. This resulted in the hackers posting spam posts through many of the user's social media accounts. On October 26, 2013, Buffer was temporarily suspended as a result of the hacking. Co-founder Joel Gascoigne sent an email to all users, apologizing about the issue and advising Buffer users about what steps they should take. Buffer was then unsuspended within the same week.

Related products and services
Daily, launched in May 2014, was an iOS app developed by Buffer that helped users manage their social media accounts on Twitter, Facebook, LinkedIn and Google+. In the app, a user could accept and share, or dismiss, suggested links and headline through Tinder-style swiping gestures.

In March 2015, Buffer launched Pablo, a social media image creation tool. Its aim is to create engaging pictures for social media within 30 seconds.

References

External links
 Official website

Social software
2010 software
Remote companies
Social media management platforms